A hamadryad is a Greek mythological being that lives in trees. It is a particular type of dryad which, in turn, is a particular type of nymph. Hamadryads are born bonded to a certain tree. Some maintain that a hamadryad is the tree itself, with a normal dryad being simply the indwelling entity, or spirit, of the tree. If the tree should die, the hamadryad associated with it would die as well. For this reason, both dryads and gods would punish mortals who harmed trees.

List of hamadryads

The Deipnosophistae of Athenaeus lists eight hamadryads, the daughters of Oxylus and Hamadryas:

 Karya (walnut or hazelnut)
 Balanos (oak)
 Kraneia (dogwood)
 Morea (mulberry)
 Aigeiros (black poplar)
 Ptelea (elm)
 Ampelos (vines, especially Vitis)
 Syke/Sykea (fig)

Other hamadryads 

 Atlanteia
 Chrysopeleia
 Phoebe
 Byblis
 Dryope
 Heliades
 Hesperides

Scientific names
The mother, Hamadryas, is immortalized in three scientific names, two of which are still valid: the generic name of the cracker butterfly, the specific name of the northernmost monkey in Asia Minor, the hamadryas baboon, and the original (but no longer valid) genus name of the king cobra (originally Hamadryas hannah, now Ophiophagus hannah). The cracker butterfly is more arboreal than most butterflies, as it commonly camouflages itself on trees. It feeds on sap, rotting fruit and dung. The hamadryas baboon is one of the least arboreal monkeys, but was the most common monkey in Hellenic lands.  The king cobra is sometimes considered arboreal or semi-arboreal, and is also referred to by the common name "hamadryad", especially in older literature.

In popular culture 
 Hamadryad is referenced as a whole in Edgar Allan Poe's poem "Sonnet To Science".
 Hamadryad is referenced in Anthony Ashley Cooper's Characteristicks of Men, Manners, Opinions, Times (1714: Treatise 4, Part 3, Section 1). 
 In Aldous Huxley's Crome Yellow, Anne Wimbush is referred to as "the slim Hamadryad whose movements were like the swaying of a young tree in the wind". 
 In George Eliot's The Mill on The Floss, Book V, Chapter 3, the character Philip Wakem uses the term to describe Maggie Tulliver.
 In William Faulkner's novel Soldier's Pay, Chapter 2, Januarius Jones uses this term to describe a young lady. 
 Both hamadryads and dryads exist in C. S. Lewis's Narnia. 
 In Robert A. Heinlein's Time Enough for Love, Hamadryad is the name of a "young" woman. 
 In John Steinbeck's To a God Unknown, Chapter 16: "Jesus is a better savior than a hamadryad".
 In Nalo Hopkinson's short story "The Smile on the Face", the main character swallows a cherry from the cherry tree that seems to be inhabited by a hamadryad.
 Brandon Mull's Fablehaven series mentions hamadryads in the third book, Grip of the Shadow Plague.
 In P L Travers' Mary Poppins, the children Jane and Michael meet a king cobra, referred to by the name Hamadryad, at the zoo.
 In Seanan McGuire's October Daye series, the hamadryad are a type of fae closely bonded to trees.
 The 1990 William Friedkin film, The Guardian, features a hamadryad as the main antagonist.

See also
 Querquetulanae, Roman nymphs of the oak

Note

References 
 The Deipnosophists, or, Banquet of the Learned of Athenaeus presented online by the University of Wisconsin Digital Collections Center

 
Nymphs
Tree goddesses